WBTF (107.9 FM), also known as 107.9 The Beat, is an urban contemporary outlet serving the Lexington radio market. It is owned by L.M. Communications.  The station's studios are located at Triangle Center in downtown Lexington, and its transmitter is located east of Versailles, Kentucky.

WBTF signed on its current format in 2000, playing hip hop and R&B music, making it the first time in six years that an Urban-formatted station returned to Lexington since WCKU flipped the format in 1994 to rock. Until recently, WBTF was the only such station in the market, and therefore played old school music, soul, slow jams and gospel occasionally to cater to both the mainstream and adult audiences in the African American community.

The station was the home of the Doug Banks Morning Show until the end of 2007, when he was replaced by Steve Harvey.

External links
107.9 The Beat website
L.M. Communications

Real-time WBTF station playlist with charts

BTF
Urban contemporary radio stations in the United States
Woodford County, Kentucky
2000 establishments in Kentucky
Radio stations established in 2000